The  (Haji-uji, Haji-shi) is a Japanese clan. The clan administered earthenware artisans, organized collectively into a group called Haji-be.  During the Yamato period, these artisans worked chiefly on soil-related matters, such as creating haniwa, constructing tombs and kofun, and handling other civil engineering. The kabane titles of the clan are Sukune or Muraji. They were engaged in constructing the tombs of high-ranking people as well as managing the funeral ceremonies of the ōkimi ("great lords").

History 
The Haji clan claims descent from Ame-no-hohi, the second son of Amaterasu, which makes them relatives of the Japanese Imperial Family. Nomi no Sukune was believed to be the ancestor of the clan. According to legend, he was the inventor of haniwa, the terracotta clay figurines buried with a nobleman and used as a symbolic substitute for junshi, the practice whereby members of high-ranking households would commit suicide upon the passing of the household head, as a way to continue serving them in death.

Name 
The hani-shi were masters of the crafts of earthenware and earthwork engineering.

See also 
 Nomi no Sukune
 Sugawara clan
 Hajinosato Station

References

Japanese clans